Stewart Ransom "Rhett" Miller II  (born September 1970) is the lead singer of the country rock band Old 97's. He also records and performs as a solo musician, and has been published as a writer of both fiction and non-fiction.

Early life 
Miller, a seventh-generation Texan, was born in Austin, Texas. Miller's parents divorced when he was 17 years old. Miller, the oldest of three children, has a younger brother and sister. Rhett's paternal grandfather, Giles E. Miller, was a young millionaire scion of a successful textile family who, in 1952 owned the first NFL football team in the south, the Dallas Texans. The Texans folded after seven games, marking the last time an NFL franchise would go bankrupt.

Miller's family lived in Highland Park, Texas, where he went to Armstrong Elementary School. In 4th grade, Miller was hospitalized for several months due to a severe inner-ear problem. In 6th grade, he began attending St. Mark's School of Texas, a private boys' school in North Dallas. He started taking guitar lessons when he was 12 years old and writing songs when he was 13.  Miller has said that his time at St. Mark's was very difficult, and that he was ostracized and bullied, leading to depression which culminated in a suicide attempt at the age of 14.   The following year in April 1985 Miller played his first gig at 500 Cafe in downtown Dallas.  Through high school Miller played in bands, becoming a local folk performer and headlining small venues and opening for such nationally touring artists as Rosanne Cash, Chris Isaak, and The Lords of the New Church. Also in high school, Miller edited St. Mark’s literary magazine and helped start an alternative literary magazine called The Rag, for which he wrote poetry.

In 1989, Miller graduated from St. Mark's School of Texas. He briefly attended Sarah Lawrence College on a creative writing scholarship before deciding to move back to Texas to pursue a music career.

Career 
In 1989, while still in high school, Miller released an album called Mythologies. The album title was taken from a book of essays by the French media philosopher Roland Barthes. Only 1,000 copies of the CD exist. Miller signed and numbered each one.

In 1990, when Miller returned to Dallas after his semester at college, Miller formed a band called Sleepy Heroes with childhood friend and future Old 97’s bassist Murry Hammond. Sleepy Heroes was a power-pop three piece. They released one album, Under a Radio Sun, before they broke up. The Old 97's song, "Victoria," was written during the last few months of Sleepy Heroes.

Miller was the lead singer of various bands in Dallas between 1990 and 1993: Rhett Miller's Third Eye, Buzz, Rhett's Exploding, and Retablo, for which Miller self-recorded an unreleased record on cassette which included some early Old 97's songs.

In 1993, Miller and Hammond formed Old 97's as a three piece acoustic act along with their neighbor at Dallas’ Marquita Court Apartments, guitarist Ken Bethea. They played as a three piece for six months before adding Darin Lin Wood on drums. He played with the band for a few weeks in the summer of 1993 before being replaced by Philip Peeples who has remained the band’s drummer ever since.

Old 97’s first album, Hitchhike To Rhome, came out on local Dallas label Big Iron Records in 1993. During the first year of Old 97’s, Miller also performed as a touring member of the band Killbilly. It was during a Killbilly tour that Miller met Nan Warshaw, owner of Chicago’s Bloodshot Records, the label which released Old 97’s second album, Wreck Your Life.

After a sold-out SXSW showcase in 1995, Old 97’s found themselves the subject of a major label bidding war. 15 record labels fought to sign the band, with Elektra Records A&R rep Tom Desavia finally inking the band to a multi-album deal. Their first Elektra release, Too Far To Care, came out in 1997, followed by Fight Songs and Satellite Rides.

In 2002, Miller released The Instigator on Elektra Records. The record was produced and recorded with Jon Brion, received critical acclaim and substantial airplay on alternative-oriented radio stations.

In 2006, Miller released The Believer on the Verve Forecast label. It includes a cover of Brion's "I Believe She's Lying" and "Fireflies," a duet with Rachael Yamagata.

In 2009, Miller released his fourth record, the self-titled Rhett Miller, on Shout! Factory. The record includes Jon Brion on guitar and bass, The Apples in Stereo's John Dufilho on drums and Billy Harvey on guitar. In 2011, Miller self-released a live recording of The Interpreter: Live at Largo.

In 2012, Miller released The Dreamer. The record, a Maximum Sunshine release which Miller self-produced, included collaborations with Rosanne Cash and Ben Kweller.

In 2015, Miller released his sixth solo record, called The Traveler, on ATO Records. The album was a notable shift for Miller, as he recorded it with a Portland, Oregon-based bluegrass band called Black Prairie, which includes members of The Decemberists. The album also features contributions from Peter Buck and Scott McCaughey of R.E.M.

In 2018, Miller released The Messenger on ATO Records.

Writing 
Miller has written short stories, essays and articles that have appeared in Rolling Stone, The Baffler, Bookforum, Sports Illustrated, McSweeney’s, The Atlantic, and Salon.

Other projects 
In addition to his solo work, Miller has worked on various collaborations, including co-writing with other musicians.
 2004: Recorded a version of Simon and Garfunkel's "Homeward Bound" for one of MasterCard's "Priceless" advertisements
 2008: Co-produced the first EP, No One Will Know, of New York band The Spring Standards
 2009: Appeared as a member of the musical ensemble in the 30 Rock episode Kidney Now!
 2019: On 1/23/19 Miller announced the 1/24 start of his podcast, Wheels Off, subtitled A Show About the Messy Reality Behind the Creative Life. In partnership with Revoice Media, it's an 11-episode series; each segment features host Miller conversing with musicians, writers, artists, actors, comedians and other creative people about the pivotal moments that shaped their work, what it means to create in a digital age and grappling with the challenges and joys of living a creative life.

Philanthropy 
In 2006, Miller and his brother Ross Miller launched the Breathe Easy Concert Series, an annual event in Dallas that raises money for the Cystic Fibrosis Foundation and awareness about cystic fibrosis.

In 2016, Miller appeared as part of the Okay to Say initiative sponsored by the Meadows Mental Health Policy Institute in Dallas, which encourages the use of therapy to prevent suicide and address mental health issues. In the campaign, Miller discusses his own suicide attempt when he was 14 years old, and how therapy has helped him over the years. Miller said that Jason Isbell encouraged him to talk publicly about his sobriety.

Personal life 
In 1997, Miller moved from Dallas to Los Angeles. In 2000, he moved to New York City. Miller and then-fiancée lived three blocks south of the World Trade Center and were home on 9/11. He shared journal writing about their experience, which was published in The Atlantic in September 2011. Miller now lives in New York's Hudson Valley.

In 2002, Miller married former model Erica Iahn a week after he completed production of The Instigator. Iahn found out she was pregnant with their first child, Max, while Miller was on tour with Tori Amos to promote the album. Their daughter, Soleil, was born in the spring of 2006.

Miller said he got the nickname "Rhett" because his mother liked Rhett Butler from the movie Gone with the Wind.

Discography

Solo albums 
 1989: Mythologies (Carpe Diem Records)
 2002: The Instigator (Elektra Records)
 2006: The Believer (Verve Forecast Records)
 2009: Rhett Miller (Shout! Factory)
 2011: The Interpreter: Live at Largo (Maximum Sunshine Records)
 2012: The Dreamer (Maximum Sunshine Records)
 2015: The Traveler (ATO Records)
 2018: The Messenger (ATO Records)
 2022: The Misfit (ATO Records)

Singles

Other contributions 
 2003: The Executioner's Last Songs: Volumes 2 & 3 (Bloodshot Records) – "Dang Me"
 2005: This Bird Has Flown - A 40th Anniversary Tribute to the Beatles' Rubber Soul (Razor & Tie) – "Girl"

Works and publications 
Chronological order
 
  – short story
 
 
 
 
 
  - poetry

References

External links

 Rhett Miller
 Old 97's
 
 

1970 births
American alternative country singers
American country singer-songwriters
American male singer-songwriters
Elektra Records artists
Living people
Musicians from Dallas
Musicians from Austin, Texas
St. Mark's School (Texas) alumni
Verve Records artists
Wrasse Records artists
American country rock singers
Singer-songwriters from Texas
People from Highland Park, Texas
21st-century American singers
Country musicians from Texas
21st-century American male singers